The Poprad-Tatry ATP Challenger Tour was a tennis tournament held in Poprad, Slovakia since 2015 to 2018. The event was part of the ATP Challenger Tour and was played on outdoor clay courts. In 2018 the tournament was moved to Bratislava.

Past finals

Singles

Doubles

References

External links 
 Official website

 
ATP Challenger Tour
Clay court tennis tournaments
Tennis tournaments in Slovakia
Summer events in Slovakia